Nneka Ukuh (born November 20, 1987) is a female track and field athlete from Nigeria. She specialised in the high jump event, and is best known for winning the gold medal for her native West African country at the 2003 All-Africa Games.

Competition record

External links
 IAAF Profile

1987 births
Living people
Nigerian female high jumpers
African Games gold medalists for Nigeria
African Games medalists in athletics (track and field)
Athletes (track and field) at the 2003 All-Africa Games
Athletes (track and field) at the 2007 All-Africa Games